Bicava is a genus of beetles in the family Latridiidae, containing the following species:

 Bicava alacris (Broun, 1880)
 Bicava amplipennis (Broun, 1893)
 Bicava angusticollis (Broun, 1880)
 Bicava castanea (Broun, 1914)
 Bicava discoidea (Broun, 1880)
 Bicava diversicollis (Belon, 1884)
 Bicava erythrocephala (Broun, 1886)
 Bicava fauveli Belon, 1885
 Bicava fulgurita Belon, 1884
 Bicava fusca (Broun, 1886)
 Bicava fuscicollis (Broun, 1912)
 Bicava gilvipes (Broun, 1886)
 Bicava globipennis (Reitter, 1881)
 Bicava illustris (Reitter, 1879)
 Bicava obesa (Broun, 1880)
 Bicava picturata Belon, 1884
 Bicava platyptera (Broun, 1886)
 Bicava pubera (Broun, 1880)
 Bicava pudibunda (Broun, 1880)
 Bicava semirufa (Broun, 1886)
 Bicava sharpi Belon, 1884
 Bicava splendens (Reitter, 1879)
 Bicava terricola Broun, 1893
 Bicava unicolor (Broun, 1914)
 Bicava variegata (Broun, 1880)
 Bicava zelandica (Belon, 1884

References

Latridiidae genera